Ten Songs from Live at Carnegie Hall is a live album by Ryan Adams, released on June 9, 2015. The album reached peak positions of number 113 on the Billboard 200 and number 14 on Billboard Top Rock Albums chart, respectively.

Track listing

Track listing adapted from AllMusic.

References

2015 live albums
Albums recorded at Carnegie Hall
PAX AM albums
Ryan Adams albums